Wenjiashi Town is an urban town in Liuyang, Hunan, People's Republic of China.  it had a population of 53,800 and an area of . It borders the towns of Zhonghe and Yonghe in the north, Wanzai County in the east, Chengtanjiang Town in the west, and Yichun and Pingxiang in the south.

History
Wenjiashi is located at the border of Hunan and Jiangxi and it was the place where forces gathered during the Autumn Harvest Uprising. The first army flag of Chinese Red Army was raised here and the "encircle the cities from the rural areas" policy-making thoughts germinated from here. It is a source place and birthplace of Chinese revolutionaries. Now, it has one state-level cultural relic protection unit, three provincial-level cultural relic protection units, three municipal-level cultural relic protection units and it was rated as a "Historic and Cultural Town of Hunan" in 2010.

Administrative division
The town is divided into 11 villages and one community, the following areas: Wenjiashi Community, Wushen Village, Baixi Village, Yanqian Village, Xinfa Village, Yongfeng Village, Shuangtian Village, Dacheng Village, Xianglong Village, Wenhua Village, Shaxi Village, and Yuquan Village.

Education
 Wenjiashi Meddle School
 Liuyang No. 11 High School

Transportation
  Provincial Highway S311

Attractions
Former Residence of Yang Yong and the Site of Joining Forces in Wenjiashi of Autumn Harvest Uprising are well-known scenic spots.

Celebrity
 Yang Yong, a general of the People's Liberation Army (PLA).

References

External links

Divisions of Liuyang
Liuyang